Prastio is the name of several villages in Cyprus:

Prastio (Avdimou), north of Avdimou, in Limassol District
Prastio, Famagusta
Prastio (Kellaki), north of Parekklisia, in Limassol District
Prastio, Nicosia, west of the town of Morphou
Prastio, Paphos, east of Paphos on the Diarizos river